Federal Route 128, or Jalan Pasir Raja and Jalan Jerangau-Jabor (Penghantar 6), is a federal road in Terengganu, Malaysia. The Kilometre Zero of the Federal Route 128 starts at Bandar Al-Muktafi Billah Shah.

Features

At most sections, the Federal Route 128 was built under the JKR R5 road standard, allowing maximum speed limit of up to 90 km/h.

List of junctions and towns

References

Malaysian Federal Roads